The New York Film Critics Online (NYFCO) is an organization founded by Harvey Karten in 2000 composed of Internet film critics based in New York City. The group meets once a year, in December, for voting on its annual NYFCO Awards.

2001

Various Awards
 Best Actor: Tom Wilkinson – In the Bedroom
 Best Actress: Judi Dench – Iris
 Best Cinematography: The Man Who Wasn't There – Roger Deakins
 Best Debut Director: Todd Field – In the Bedroom
 Best Director: David Lynch – Mulholland Drive
 Best Documentary: The Gleaners and I
 Best Film: Mulholland Drive
 Best Foreign Language Film: 花樣年華 (In the Mood for Love) • Hong Kong
 Best Screenplay (Adapted): In the Bedroom – Todd Field and Robert Festinger
 Best Screenplay (Original): Mulholland Drive – David Lynch
 Best Supporting Actor: Steve Buscemi – Ghost World
 Best Supporting Actress: Maggie Smith – Gosford Park
 Breakthrough Performer: Naomi Watts – Mulholland Drive

2002

Various Awards
 Best Actor: Daniel Day-Lewis – Gangs of New York
 Best Actress: Julianne Moore – Far from Heaven
 Best Animated Film: Spirited Away
 Best Cinematography: Far from Heaven – Edward Lachman
 Best Director: Todd Haynes – Far from Heaven and Martin Scorsese – Gangs of New York (tie)
 Best Documentary: Bowling for Columbine
 Best Film: Chicago
 Best Foreign Language Film: Y Tu Mamá También (And Your Mother Too) • Mexiko
 Best Screenplay: Far from Heaven – Todd Haynes
 Best Supporting Actor: Willem Dafoe – Spider-Man
 Best Supporting Actress: Edie Falco – Sunshine State

2003

Top 10 Films

 1. Lost in Translation
 2. American Splendor
 3. In America
 4. 21 Grams
 5. A Mighty Wind
 5. Cold Mountain
 5. Girl with a Pearl Earring
 5. Lawless Heart
 5. Les invasions barbares (The Barbarian Invasions)
 10. The Station Agent

Various Awards
 Best Actor: Bill Murray – Lost in Translation
 Best Actress: Charlize Theron – Monster
 Best Animated Film: Finding Nemo
 Best Cinematography: Girl with a Pearl Earring – Eduardo Serra Best Director: Sofia Coppola – Lost in Translation  Best Documentary: Winged Migration Best Film: Lost in Translation Best Foreign Language Film: Demonlover • France
 Best Screenplay: In America – Jim Sheridan, Naomi Sheridan, and Kirsten Sheridan
 Best Supporting Actor: Alec Baldwin – The Cooler Best Supporting Actress: Scarlett Johansson – Lost in Translation Breakthrough Performer: Peter Dinklage – The Station Agent2004
Top 9 Films
 Sideways The Aviator Before Sunset Ying xiong (Hero) Kinsey La mala educación (Bad Education) The Incredibles Diarios de motocicleta (The Motorcycle Diaries) Shi mian mai fu (House of Flying Daggers)Various Awards
 Best Actor: Jamie Foxx – Ray Best Actress: Imelda Staunton – Vera Drake Best Animated Film: The Incredibles Best Cinematography: Ying xiong (Hero) – Christopher Doyle
 Best Debut Director: Joshua Marston – Maria Full of Grace Best Director: Martin Scorsese – The Aviator  Best Documentary: Broadway: The Golden Age and Super Size Me (tie)
 Best Film: Sideways  Best Foreign Language Film: Diarios de motocicleta (The Motorcycle Diaries) • United States/Germany/UK/Argentina/Chile/Peru/France
 Best Screenplay: Eternal Sunshine of the Spotless Mind – Charlie Kaufman
 Best Supporting Actor: Thomas Haden Church – Sideways Best Supporting Actress: Virginia Madsen – Sideways Breakthrough Performer: Topher Grace – P.S. and In Good Company2005
Top 9 Films
(Alphabetical order)
 Brokeback Mountain Capote The Constant Gardener Crash Good Night, and Good Luck La meglio gioventù (The Best of Youth) Munich The Squid and the Whale SyrianaVarious Awards
 Best Actor: Philip Seymour Hoffman – Capote Best Actress: Keira Knightley – Pride & Prejudice Best Animated Film: Wallace & Gromit: The Curse of the Were-Rabbit Best Cinematography: March of the Penguins – Laurent Chalet and Jérôme Maison
 Best Debut Director: Paul Haggis – Crash Best Director: Fernando Meirelles – The Constant Gardener Best Documentary: Grizzly Man Best Film: The Squid and the Whale Best Foreign Language Film: Der Untergang (Downfall) • Austria/Germany/Italy
 Best Screenplay: Crash – Paul Haggis
 Best Supporting Actor: Oliver Platt – Casanova Best Supporting Actress: Amy Adams – Junebug Breakthrough Performer: Terrence Howard – Crash, Four Brothers, Get Rich or Die Tryin', and Hustle & Flow2006
Top 10 Films
(Alphabetical order)
 Babel The Fountain Inland Empire Pan's Labyrinth (El laberinto del fauno) Little Children Little Miss Sunshine The Queen Thank You for Smoking Volver WaterVarious Awards
 Best Actor: Forest Whitaker – The Last King of Scotland Best Actress: Helen Mirren – The Queen Best Animated Film: Happy Feet Best Cast: Little Miss Sunshine Best Cinematography: The Illusionist – Dick Pope
 Best Debut Director: Jonathan Dayton and Valerie Faris – Little Miss Sunshine Best Director: Stephen Frears – The Queen Best Documentary: An Inconvenient Truth Best Film: The Queen Best Film Music or Score: The Illusionist – Philip Glass
 Best Foreign Language Film: El laberinto del fauno (Pan's Labyrinth) • Mexico
 Best Screenplay: The Queen – Peter Morgan
 Best Supporting Actor: Michael Sheen – The Queen Best Supporting Actress: Jennifer Hudson – Dreamgirls and Catherine O'Hara – For Your Consideration (tie)
 Breakthrough Performer: Jennifer Hudson – Dreamgirls2007
Top 11 Films
(Alphabetical order)
 Atonement Before the Devil Knows You're Dead The Darjeeling Limited The Diving Bell and the Butterfly (Le scaphandre et le papillon) I'm Not There Juno Michael Clayton No Country for Old Men Persepolis Sweeney Todd: The Demon Barber of Fleet Street There Will Be BloodVarious Awards
 Best Actor: Daniel Day-Lewis – There Will Be Blood 
 Best Actress: Julie Christie – Away from Her Best Animated Film: Persepolis Best Cast: Before the Devil Knows You're Dead Best Cinematography: There Will Be Blood – Robert Elswit
 Best Debut Director: Sarah Polley – Away from Her Best Director: Paul Thomas Anderson – There Will Be Blood Best Documentary: Sicko Best Film: The Diving Bell and the Butterfly (Le scaphandre et le papillon) and There Will Be Blood (tie)
 Best Film Music or Score: There Will Be Blood – Jonny Greenwood
 Best Foreign Language Film: Das Leben der Anderen (The Lives of Others) • Germany and Persepolis • France (tie)
 Best Screenplay: The Darjeeling Limited – Wes Anderson, Jason Schwartzman, and Roman Coppola
 Best Supporting Actor: Javier Bardem – No Country for Old Men Best Supporting Actress: Cate Blanchett – I'm Not There Breakthrough Performer: Elliot Page – Juno2008
Top 10 Films
(Alphabetical order)
 Che A Christmas Tale (Un conte de Noël) The Curious Case of Benjamin Button The Dark Knight Happy-Go-Lucky Milk Rachel Getting Married Slumdog Millionaire WALL-E The WrestlerVarious Awards
 Best Actor: Sean Penn – Milk Best Actress: Sally Hawkins – Happy-Go-Lucky Best Animated Film: WALL-E Best Cast: Milk Best Cinematography: Slumdog Millionaire – Anthony Dod Mantle
 Best Debut Director: Martin McDonagh – In Bruges Best Director: Danny Boyle and Loveleen Tandan – Slumdog Millionaire Best Documentary: Man on Wire Best Film: Slumdog Millionaire Best Film Music or Score: Slumdog Millionaire – A. R. Rahman
 Best Foreign Language Film: 4 luni, 3 săptămâni și 2 zile (4 Months, 3 Weeks and 2 Days) • Romania
 Best Screenplay: Slumdog Millionaire – Simon Beaufoy 
 Best Supporting Actor: Heath Ledger – The Dark Knight (posthumously)
 Best Supporting Actress: Penélope Cruz – Vicky Cristina Barcelona Breakthrough Performer: Sally Hawkins – Happy-Go-Lucky2009
Top 11 Films
(Alphabetical order)
 Adventureland Avatar Fantastic Mr. Fox The Hurt Locker Inglourious Basterds The Messenger Precious A Serious Man Two Lovers Up Up in the AirVarious Awards
 Best Actor: Jeff Bridges – Crazy Heart Best Actress: Meryl Streep – Julie & Julia Best Animated Film: Up Best Cast: In the Loop Best Cinematography: Inglourious Basterds – Robert Richardson
 Best Debut Director: Marc Webb – (500) Days of Summer Best Director: Kathryn Bigelow – The Hurt Locker Best Documentary: The Cove Best Film: Avatar Best Film Music or Score: Crazy Heart – Steve Bruton, T Bone Burnett, and Jeffrey Pollack
 Best Foreign Language Film: Das weiße Band – Eine deutsche Kindergeschichte (The White Ribbon) • Germany
 Best Screenplay: Inglourious Basterds – Quentin Tarantino
 Best Supporting Actor: Christoph Waltz – Inglourious Basterds Best Supporting Actress: Mo'Nique – Precious Breakthrough Performer: Christoph Waltz – Inglourious Basterds2010
Top 10 Films
(Alphabetical order)
 127 Hours Another Year Black Swan Blue Valentine The Ghost Writer Inception The Kids Are All Right The King's Speech Scott Pilgrim vs. the World The Social NetworkVarious Awards
 Best Actor: James Franco – 127 Hours Best Actress: Natalie Portman – Black Swan Best Animated Film: Toy Story 3 Best Cast: The Kids Are All Right Best Cinematography: Black Swan – Matthew Libatique
 Best Debut Director: John Wells – The Company Men Best Director: David Fincher – The Social Network Best Documentary: Exit Through the Gift Shop Best Film: The Social Network Best Film Music or Score: Black Swan – Clint Mansell
 Best Foreign Language Film: Io sono l'amore (I Am Love) • Italy
 Best Screenplay: The Social Network – Aaron Sorkin
 Best Supporting Actor: Christian Bale – The Fighter Best Supporting Actress: Melissa Leo – The Fighter Breakthrough Performer: Noomi Rapace – The Girl with the Dragon Tattoo2011
Top 10 Films
(Alphabetical order)
 The Artist The Descendants Drive The Help Hugo Melancholia Midnight in Paris Take Shelter The Tree of Life War HorseVarious Awards
 Best Actor: Michael Shannon – Take Shelter Best Actress: Meryl Streep – The Iron Lady Best Animated Film: The Adventures of Tintin: The Secret of the Unicorn Best Cast: Bridesmaids Best Cinematography: The Tree of Life – Emmanuel Lubezki
 Best Debut Director: Joe Cornish – Attack the Block Best Director: Michel Hazanavicius – The Artist Best Documentary: Cave of Forgotten Dreams Best Film: The Artist Best Film Music or Score: The Artist – Ludovic Bource
 Best Foreign Language Film: جدایی نادر از سیمین (A Separation) • Iran
 Best Screenplay: The Descendants – Nat Faxon, Jim Rash, and Alexander Payne
 Best Supporting Actor: Albert Brooks – Drive Best Supporting Actress: Melissa McCarthy – Bridesmaids Breakthrough Performer: Jessica Chastain – The Tree of Life, The Help, The Debt, and Take Shelter2012
Top 10 Films
(Alphabetical order)
 Argo Beasts of the Southern Wild Django Unchained Les Misérables Life of Pi Lincoln The Master Moonrise Kingdom Silver Linings Playbook Zero Dark ThirtyVarious Awards
 Best Actor: Daniel Day-Lewis – Lincoln Best Actress: Emmanuelle Riva – Amour Best Animated Film: Chico and Rita Best Cast: Argo Best Cinematography: Life of Pi – Claudio Miranda
 Best Debut Director: Benh Zeitlin – Beasts of the Southern Wild Best Director: Kathryn Bigelow – Zero Dark Thirty Best Documentary: The Central Park Five Best Film: Zero Dark Thirty Best Film Music or Score: Django Unchained – Various Artists
 Best Foreign Language Film: Amour • France
 Best Screenplay: Zero Dark Thirty – Mark Boal
 Best Supporting Actor: Tommy Lee Jones – Lincoln Best Supporting Actress: Anne Hathaway – Les Misérables Breakthrough Performer: Quvenzhané Wallis – Beasts of the Southern Wild2013
Top 11 Films
(Alphabetical order)
 12 Years a Slave Before Midnight Blue Is the Warmest Colour Dallas Buyers Club Gravity Her Inside Llewyn Davis Nebraska Philomena Prisoners The Wolf of Wall StreetVarious Awards
 Best Actor: Chiwetel Ejiofor – 12 Years a Slave Best Actress: Cate Blanchett – Blue Jasmine Best Animated Film: The Wind Rises Best Cast: American Hustle Best Cinematography: Gravity – Emmanuel Lubezki
 Best Debut Director: Ryan Coogler – Fruitvale Station Best Director: Alfonso Cuarón – Gravity Best Documentary: The Act of Killing Best Film: 12 Years a Slave Best Film Music or Score: Inside Llewyn Davis – T Bone Burnett
 Best Foreign Language Film: La Vie d'Adèle : Chapitres 1 et 2 (Blue Is the Warmest Colour) • France
 Best Screenplay: Her – Spike Jonze
 Best Supporting Actor: Jared Leto – Dallas Buyers Club Best Supporting Actress: Lupita Nyong'o – 12 Years a Slave Breakthrough Performer: Adèle Exarchopoulos – Blue Is the Warmest Colour2014
Top 10 Films
(Alphabetical order)
 Birdman or (The Unexpected Virtue of Ignorance) Boyhood Guardians of the Galaxy The Imitation Game A Most Violent Year Mr. Turner Selma The Theory of Everything Under the Skin WhiplashVarious Awards
 Best Actor: Eddie Redmayne – The Theory of Everything Best Actress: Marion Cotillard – Two Days, One Night Best Animated Film: The Lego Movie Best Cast: Birdman or (The Unexpected Virtue of Ignorance) Best Cinematography: Birdman or (The Unexpected Virtue of Ignorance) – Emmanuel Lubezki
 Best Debut Director: Dan Gilroy – Nightcrawler Best Director: Richard Linklater – Boyhood Best Documentary: Life Itself Best Film: Boyhood Best Film Music or Score: Get On Up – Thomas Newman
 Best Foreign Language Film: Deux jours, une nuit (Two Days, One Night) • Belgium
 Best Screenplay: Birdman or (The Unexpected Virtue of Ignorance) – Alejandro G. Iñárritu, Nicolás Giacobone, Alexander Dinelaris Jr., and Armando Bo
 Best Supporting Actor: J. K. Simmons – Whiplash Best Supporting Actress: Patricia Arquette – Boyhood Breakthrough Performer: Jack O'Connell – Unbroken and Starred Up2015
Top 10 Films
(Alphabetical order)
 45 Years The Big Short Bridge of Spies Brooklyn Carol Mad Max: Fury Road Sicario Spotlight Steve Jobs TrumboVarious Awards
 Best Actor: Paul Dano – Love & Mercy Best Actress: Brie Larson – Room Best Animated Film: Inside Out Best Cast: Spotlight Best Cinematography: Mad Max: Fury Road – John Seale
 Best Debut Director: Alex Garland – Ex Machina Best Director: Tom McCarthy – Spotlight Best Documentary: Amy Best Film: Spotlight Best Film Music or Score: Love & Mercy – Brian Wilson and Atticus Ross
 Best Foreign Language Film: Saul fia (Son of Saul) • Hungary
 Best Screenplay: Spotlight – Tom McCarthy and Josh Singer
 Best Supporting Actor: Mark Rylance – Bridge of Spies Best Supporting Actress: Rooney Mara – Carol Breakthrough Performer: Alicia Vikander – The Danish Girl and Ex Machina2016
Top 12 Films
(Alphabetical order)
 Arrival Fences Free State of Jones Hell or High Water I, Daniel Blake Jackie La La Land Loving Manchester by the Sea Moonlight O.J.: Made in America Toni ErdmannVarious Awards
 Best Actor: Casey Affleck – Manchester by the Sea Best Actress: Isabelle Huppert – Elle Best Animated Film: Kubo and the Two Strings Best Cast: Moonlight Best Cinematography: Moonlight – James Laxton
 Best Debut Director: Robert Eggers – The Witch Best Director: Barry Jenkins – Moonlight Best Documentary: 13th Best Film: Moonlight Best Film Music or Score: La La Land – Justin Hurwitz
 Best Foreign Language Film: 아가씨 (The Handmaiden) • South Korea
 Best Screenplay: Moonlight – Barry Jenkins
 Best Supporting Actor: Mahershala Ali – Moonlight Best Supporting Actress: Viola Davis – Fences Breakthrough Performer: Ruth Negga – Loving2017
Top 10 Films
(Alphabetical order)
 Call Me by Your Name Dunkirk The Florida Project Get Out I, Tonya Lady Bird Mudbound Phantom Thread The Post The Shape of WaterVarious Awards
 Best Actor: Gary Oldman – Darkest Hour Best Actress: Margot Robbie – I, Tonya Best Animated Film: Coco Best Cast: Mudbound Best Cinematography: The Shape of Water – Dan Laustsen
 Best Debut Director: Jordan Peele – Get Out Best Director: Dee Rees – Mudbound Best Documentary: Bombshell: The Hedy Lamarr Story Best Film: The Florida Project and Mudbound (tie)
 Best Film Music or Score: Baby Driver – Steven Price and Kristen Lane
 Best Foreign Language Film: Aus dem Nichts (In the Fade) • Germany
 Best Screenplay: Get Out – Jordan Peele
 Best Supporting Actor: Willem Dafoe – The Florida Project Best Supporting Actress: Allison Janney – I, Tonya Breakthrough Performer: Timothée Chalamet – Call Me by Your Name2018

Top 10 Films
 BlacKkKlansman Eighth Grade The Favourite First Reformed Green Book If Beale Street Could Talk Leave No Trace Roma A Star Is Born ViceVarious Awards
 Best Actor: Ethan Hawke - First Reformed Best Actress: Melissa McCarthy - Can You Ever Forgive Me? Best Animated Feature: Spider-Man: Into the Spider-Verse Best Breakthrough Performance: Elsie Fisher - Eighth Grade Best Cinematography: Roma Best Director: Alfonso Cuaron - Roma Best Debut Director: Bo Burnham - Eighth Grade Best Documentary: Won't You Be My Neighbor? Best Ensemble: The Favourite Best Foreign Language Film: Cold War Best Screenplay: The Favourite Best Supporting Actor: Richard E. Grant - Can You Ever Forgive Me? Best Supporting Actress: Regina King - If Beale Street Could Talk Best Use of Music: If Beale Street Could Talk2019

Top 10 Films
(Alphabetical order)
 1917 The Farewell Hustlers The Irishman Jojo Rabbit Joker Marriage Story Once Upon a Time in Hollywood Parasite The Two PopesVarious Awards
 Best Actor: Joaquin Phoenix – Joker Best Actress: Lupita Nyong'o – Us Best Animated Film: I Lost My Body Best Cast: Knives Out Best Cinematography: 1917 – Roger Deakins
 Best Debut Director: Lila Avilés – The Chambermaid Best Director: Bong Joon-ho – Parasite Best Documentary: Apollo 11 Best Film: Parasite Best Foreign Language Film: Portrait of a Lady on Fire • France
 Best Screenplay: Parasite – Bong Joon-ho and Han Jin-won
 Best Supporting Actor: Joe Pesci – The Irishman Best Supporting Actress: Laura Dern – Marriage Story Best Use of Music: Rocketman Breakthrough Performer: Kelvin Harrison Jr. – Luce and Waves2020

Top 10 Films
(Alphabetical order)
 The Assistant First Cow I'm Thinking of Ending Things Minari Never Rarely Sometimes Always Nomadland One Night in Miami... Promising Young Woman Tommaso The Trial of the Chicago 7Various Awards
 Best Actor: Riz Ahmed – Sound of Metal Best Actress: Carey Mulligan – Promising Young Woman Best Animated Film: Soul Best Cast: The Trial of the Chicago 7 Best Cinematography: Joshua James Richards – Nomadland Best Debut Director: Emerald Fennell – Promising Young Woman Best Director: Chloé Zhao – Nomadland Best Documentary: The Way I See It Best Film: Minari Best Foreign Language Film: Minari • United States
 Best Screenplay: Emerald Fennell – Promising Young Woman Best Supporting Actor: Leslie Odom Jr. – One Night in Miami... Best Supporting Actress: Ellen Burstyn – Pieces of a Woman and Youn Yuh-jung – Minari (tie)
 Best Use of Music: Branford Marsalis – Ma Rainey's Black Bottom Breakthrough Performer: Kingsley Ben-Adir – One Night in Miami... and Maria Bakalova – Borat Subsequent Moviefilm'' (tie)

Notes

References

External links
 NYFCO.net Official site

 
American film critics associations